Original Rockers is a reggae album by Augustus Pablo and is a compilation of singles, all recorded between 1972 and 1975. It was originally released in 1979 on Greensleeves Records and was compiled by journalist and photographer Dave Hendley.

It features Robbie Shakespeare and Aston Barrett on bass guitar, Earl "Chinna" Smith on guitar and guest vocals from Dillinger on the track 'Brace a Boy'.

It was recorded at Channel One Studios and Dynamic Sounds in Kingston, Jamaica and mixed by legendary dub producer King Tubby.

Track listing

 "Rockers Dub"
 "Up Warrika Hill"
 "Cassava Piece"
 "Tubbys Dub Song"
 "Jah Dread"
 "Brace a Boy"
 "Thunder Clap"
 "Park Lane Special"
 "New Style"
 "AP Special" (Adapted)

Bonus tracks featured on #GREWCD 8 release

 "Tubby's Dub Song (Dub Version 2)"
 "Brace a Boy (Dub Version 2)"

Personnel
 Augustus Pablo – keyboards, melodica, piano, organ, clavinet
 Dillinger – vocals
 Carlton Barrett – drums
 Robbie Shakespeare, Aston Barrett – bass guitar
 Earl "Chinna" Smith – guitar
 Don D. Junior – trombone
 Bobby Ellis – trumpet
 Dirty Harry – tenor saxophone
 King Tubby, Philip Smart and Prince Jammy – Mixing Engineers

References

External links

Augustus Pablo albums
1979 compilation albums
Greensleeves Records albums